Zheng Kunliang (born 4 January 1981) is a Chinese former swimmer who competed in the 2004 Summer Olympics.

References

1981 births
Living people
Swimmers from Zhejiang
Chinese male freestyle swimmers
Olympic swimmers of China
Swimmers at the 2004 Summer Olympics
Sportspeople from Ningbo
21st-century Chinese people